Ben Dale is an unincorporated community in Lewis County, West Virginia, United States.

References 

Unincorporated communities in West Virginia
Unincorporated communities in Lewis County, West Virginia